"Gossip" is a song by Italian rock band Måneskin featuring American guitarist Tom Morello. It was released on 13 January 2023 as the fourth single from their third studio album Rush! (2023).

Critics reception 
The song was positively received by music critics, appreciating the instrumental intervention of Tom Morello and the orientation to hard rock sounds. Will Richards of NME called the song's sounds "rock'n'roll with rough guitars and a driving beat"; similarly Abby Jones of Consequence wrote that the sounds are in continuity with the band's "catchy, danceable rock," calling Morello's solo "emphatic."

Lyrically, Italian specialized critics pointed out that "Gossip" represents a "critique of the vacuity of the American gossiping good world" and especially of the city of Los Angeles, which according to Rolling Stone Italia does not represent "the city of angels" but that "of lies where "everything has a price" and "you can become a movie star. You can have it all, 'as long as you get a plastic face.'" Specifically, Vanity Fair Italia's Mario Manca explained that the group sings against "gossip and its pitfalls" since it "ruins the lives of well-known people by inventing news and fueling suspicion and fear."

Music video 
The music video for the song, directed by Tommaso Ottomano, was released on 13 January 2023, the same day the single was released.

Charts

Weekly charts

Monthly charts

References 

2023 singles
2023 songs
Måneskin songs
Songs written by Damiano David
Songs written by Joe Janiak
Songs written by Madison Love
Songs written by Victoria De Angelis